Lazaros Eleftheriadis (born 2 September 1997) is a Greek professional footballer who plays as an attacking midfielder and winger Super League 2 club Veria.

Career
Born in Aridea, Greece, Eleftheriadis made his debut as a senior player with Trikala, a Greek Football League club, in the 2019–20 season.

Initially signed by the Greek club Own Under 19s, he had no appearances for the senior squad and was transferred to Almopos Aridea in 2014. He then signed up with Thyella Filotas, playing in the Gamma Ethniki, where he remained until 2016. By mid 2016, he signed a three-season contract with the Almopos Aridea team playing in the Gamma Ethniki.

In 2019, he penned a deal with Trikala,  and made appearances in the Greek Football Cup in 2019–20 season.

Career statistics

References

1997 births
Living people
Greek footballers
Association football midfielders
Football League (Greece) players
Trikala F.C. players
Veria NFC players
Footballers from Aridaia